Elettra Deiana (23 May 1941 – 4 February 2023) was an Italian teacher and politician. A member of the Communist Refoundation Party, she served in the Chamber of Deputies from 2001 to 2008.

Deiana died in Rome on 4 February 2023, at the age of 81.

References

1941 births
2023 deaths
Communist Refoundation Party politicians
Left Ecology Freedom politicians
Italian Left politicians
Sapienza University of Rome alumni
21st-century Italian politicians
21st-century Italian women politicians
People from Cagliari
Deputies of Legislature XIV of Italy
Deputies of Legislature XV of Italy